Národní listy ("The National Newspaper") was a Czech newspaper published in Prague from 1861 to 1941.

History
The decision to start Národni listy  began in September 1860. The first issue of the newspaper was first published in January 1861 in an edition of 7000 copies. 

From 1861 to 1894 it was published by Julius Grégr; since 1874 it was the main newspaper of the Young Czech Party. The Grégr family owned and published the newspaper up until 1910; when it was transferred to the printing house Pražská akciová tiskárna founded by two other members of the Young Czech Party, Karel Kramář and Alois Rašín.

In October 1917, brothers Josef Čapek and Karel Čapek joined the staff as writers, but they left in April 1921 when the paper shifted toward increasingly narrow nationalistic orientations. The paper was briefly suspended a few months before Czechoslovak Independence Day (28 October 1918). 

From 1918 to 1938 it was the main newspaper of National Democratic Party (Czechoslovakia) and the National Unification, both led by Karel Kramář. After the Nazi occupation of Czechoslovakia, it operated as the newspaper of National Partnership, the only political party that was allowed. In April 1941 it ceased its publishing.

Prominent Editors
Jan Neruda, Vitezslav Hálek, Karel Sladkovský, editor Josef Anýž, Karel Čapek, Chod Matthew, Josef Čapek, Viktor Dyk, Jindriska Konopásková, Jakub Arbes .

References

1861 establishments in the Austrian Empire
1914 disestablishments in Austria-Hungary
Czech-language newspapers
Defunct newspapers published in Czechoslovakia
Newspapers established in 1861
Newspapers published in Prague
Publications disestablished in 1941